Harrison John Palmer (born 13 October 1996) is an English former first-class cricketer.

Palmer made his debut in first-class cricket for Cambridge MCCU against Essex at Fenner's. He played first-class cricket for Cambridge MCCU until 2018, making a total of five appearances. He scored 123 runs in these matches, with a high score of 32. In addition to playing first-class cricket, Harrison also played minor counties cricket for Hertfordshire in 2016, making four appearances in the Minor Counties Championship.

References

External links

1996 births
Living people
People from Enfield, London
English cricketers
Cambridge MCCU cricketers
Hertfordshire cricketers